This is a complete list of all the singles that entered the VG-lista - the official Norwegian hit-chart - in 1959. 48 singles entered the VG-lista in 1959 altogether and these are all listed below according to how well they have charted over time.

1959

Top singles of 1959

External links
 VG-Lista - the official Norwegian hit-chart
 VG-lista - Top 100 singles of all time in Norway

Norwegian record charts
1959 record charts
1959 in Norwegian music
Norwegian music-related lists